The 2020-21 RPI Engineers Men's ice hockey season would have been the 102nd season of play for the program and the 60th season in the ECAC Hockey conference. The Engineers represent Rensselaer Polytechnic Institute, play their home games at Houston Field House.

Season
On July 1, 2020, Rensselaer announced that all of their athletic programs would be suspended for the fall semester due to concerns over the COVID-19 pandemic. The school did not make a determination on the fate of their spring semester at the time and said that the final decision on winter and spring sports would be made in due course. After 18 members of Yale's ice hockey team tested positive in October, the season for all college hockey teams was put in jeopardy. Less than a month later the Ivy League made the decision to cancel all winter sports. As a result of that decision, which cut ECAC Hockey in half for the 2020–21 season, Rensselaer elected to follow suit and cancel their season as well on November 16th.

Departures

Recruiting

† played junior hockey or equivalent during 2020–21 season.

Roster
As of January 26, 2021.

Standings

Schedule and Results
Season Cancelled

References

RPI Engineers men's ice hockey seasons
RPI Engineers
RPI Engineers
RPI Engineers
2020 in sports in New York (state)
2021 in sports in New York (state)